John Southby (1594–1683) was an English landowner and politician who sat in the House of Commons from 1654 to 1656.

Southby was the son of Richard Southby of Carswell Manor in the parish of Buckland in Berkshire (now Oxfordshire) and his wife, Jane, the daughter of Edward Keate of Lockinge in Berkshire (now Oxfordshire). His father died when he was twelve and he inherited the manor which he is considered responsible for rebuilding in the first half of the 17th century. He was a Justice of the Peace for Berkshire and was High Sheriff of Berkshire in 1647.

In 1654, Southby was elected Member of Parliament for Berkshire in the First Protectorate Parliament. He was re-elected MP for Berkshire in 1656 for the Second Protectorate Parliament

Southby married Elizabeth Wiseman daughter and heiress of William Wiseman of Steventon in Berkshire (now Oxfordshire). Their son Richard was also an MP.

References

1594 births
1683 deaths
17th-century English landowners
High Sheriffs of Berkshire
People from Buckland, Oxfordshire
Members of the Parliament of England for Berkshire
English MPs 1654–1655
English MPs 1656–1658